Václav is a Czech drama film, directed by Jiří Vejdělek
in 2007.

Cast
Ivan Trojan as Václav Vingl
Emília Vášáryová as Václav's mother
Jan Budař as František
Soňa Norisová as Lída
Jiří Lábus as chief magistrate
Petra Špalková as Majka
Martin Pechlát as Father
Martina Delišová as young mother
Jan Vlasák as Pilecký
Zuzana Kronerová as hostelry
Gregor Bauer as little Václav
Hynek Bečka as little František
Miroslav Moravec - voice of little Václav's 
Jan Šťastný - voice of little František

External links
 Official website
 

2007 films
Czech drama films
Czech Lion Awards winners (films)
2000s Czech-language films
2000s Czech films